All Is Fair in Love and War may refer to:

 "All is fair in love and war", a proverb attributed to John Lyly's Euphues
 All Is Fair in Love and War (album), an album by Blessed by a Broken Heart
 "All Is Fair in Love and War" (song), a song by Ronnie Milsap
"All is Fair in Love and War", the second episode of the ninth season of reality TV show, Total Divas